The 1993/94 FIS Ski Jumping Continental Cup was the 3rd in a row (1st official) Continental Cup winter season in ski jumping for men. Europa Cup was a predecessor of Continental Cup.

Other competitive circuits this season included the World Cup season.

Calendar

Men

Standings

Men

Europa Cup vs. Continental Cup 
Last two seasons of Europa Cup in 1991/92 and 1992/93 are recognized as first two Continental Cup seasons by International Ski Federation, although Continental Cup under this name officially started first season in 1993/94 season.

References

FIS Ski Jumping Continental Cup
1993 in ski jumping
1994 in ski jumping